The English Wikipedia is, with the Simple English Wikipedia, one of two English-language editions of Wikipedia, an online encyclopedia. It was founded on January 15, 2001, as Wikipedia's first edition, and, as of 
The edition's one-billionth edit was made on January 13, 2021.

Articles 

Editors of the English Wikipedia have pioneered some ideas as conventions, policies or features which were later adopted by Wikipedia editions in some of the other languages. These ideas include "featured articles", the neutral-point-of-view policy, navigation templates, the sorting of short "stub" articles into sub-categories, dispute resolution mechanisms such as mediation and arbitration, and weekly collaborations.

It surpassed six million articles on 23 January 2020. In November 2022, the total volume of the compressed texts of its articles amounted to 20 gigabytes.

The edition's one-billionth edit was made on 13 January 2021 by Ser Amantio di Nicolao (Steven Pruitt) who as of that date is the user with the highest number of edits on the English Wikipedia, at over four million. Currently, there are  articles created with  files.

Wikipedians
The English Wikipedia reached 4,000,000 registered user accounts on 1 April 2007, over a year since the millionth Wikipedian registered an account in February 2006.

Over 1,100,000 editors have edited Wikipedia more than 10 times. Over 30,000 editors perform more than 5 edits per month, and over 3,000 perform more than 100 edits per month.

On March 1, 2014, The Economist, in an article titled "The Future of Wikipedia", cited a trend analysis concerning data published by the Wikimedia Foundation stating that "[t]he number of editors for the English-language version has fallen by a third in seven years." The attrition rate for active editors in English Wikipedia was cited by The Economist as substantially in contrast to statistics for Wikipedia in other languages (non-English Wikipedia). The Economist reported that the number of contributors with an average of five or more edits per month was relatively constant since 2008 for Wikipedia in other languages at approximately 42,000 editors within narrow seasonal variances of about 2,000 editors up or down. The number of active editors in English Wikipedia, by "sharp" comparison, was cited as peaking in 2007 at approximately 50,000 and dropping to 30,000 by the start of 2014.

The trend analysis published in The Economist presents Wikipedia in other languages (non-English Wikipedia) as successful in retaining their active editors on a renewable and sustained basis, with their numbers remaining relatively constant at approximately 42,000.

The English Wikipedia has the Arbitration Committee (also known as ArbCom) that consists of a panel of editors that imposes binding rulings with regard to disputes between other editors of the online encyclopedia. It was created by Jimmy Wales on 4 December 2003 as an extension of the decision-making power he had formerly held as owner of the site. When it was founded, the committee consisted of 12 arbitrators divided into three groups of four members each.

In 2022, for English Wikipedia, Americans accounted for about 40% of active editors, followed by British and Indian editors accounting for about 10% of each, and Canadian and Australian at about 5%.

Controversies

English varieties
One controversy in the English Wikipedia concerns which national variety of the English language is to be preferred, two candidates being American English and British English. Suggestions range from standardizing upon a single form of English to forking the English Wikipedia project. A style guideline states, "the English Wikipedia has no general preference for a major national variety of the language" and "an article on a topic that has strong ties to a particular English-speaking nation uses the appropriate variety of English for that nation".

Disputed articles 
A 2013 study from Oxford University concluded that the most disputed articles on the English Wikipedia tended to be broader issues, while on other language Wikipedias the most disputed articles tended to be regional issues; this is due to the English language's status as a global lingua franca, which means that some who edit the English Wikipedia have English as their second language. The study stated that the most disputed entries on the English Wikipedia were: George W. Bush, anarchism, Muhammad, list of WWE personnel, global warming, circumcision, United States, Jesus, race and intelligence, and Christianity.

Threats against high schools 
Incidents of threats of violence against high schools on Wikipedia have been reported in the press. The Glen A. Wilson High School was the subject of such a threat in 2008, and a 14-year-old was arrested for making a threat against Niles West High School on Wikipedia in 2006.

Wikiproject and assessment 

A "WikiProject" is a group of contributors who want to work together as a team to improve Wikipedia. These groups may focus on a specific topic area (for example, women's history), a specific location or a specific kind of task (for example, checking newly created pages). As of August 2022, the English Wikipedia had over 2,000 WikiProjects, for which activity varied.

In 2007, in preparation for producing a print version, the English Wikipedia introduced an assessment scale of the quality of articles. Articles are rated by WikiProjects. The range of quality classes begins with "Stub" (very short pages), followed by "Start", "C" and "B" (in increasing order of quality). Community peer review is needed for the article to enter one of the quality classes: either "good article", "A" or the highest, "featured article". Of the about 6.5 million articles and lists assessed as of April 2022, more than 6,000 (0.09%) are featured articles, and fewer than 4,000 (0.06%) are featured lists. One featured article per day, as selected by editors, appears on the main page of Wikipedia.

The Wikipedia Version 1.0 Editorial Team has developed a table (shown below) that displays data of all rated articles by quality and importance, on the English Wikipedia. If an article or list receives different ratings by two or more WikiProjects, then the highest rating is used in the table, pie-charts, and bar-chart. The software auto-updates the data.

Researcher Giacomo Poderi found that articles tend to reach featured status via the intensive work of a few editors. A 2010 study found unevenness in quality among featured articles and concluded that the community process is ineffective in assessing the quality of articles.

Internal news publications 

Community-produced news publications include The Signpost. The Signpost (previously known as The Wikipedia Signpost) is the English Wikipedia's newspaper. It is managed by the Wikipedia community and is published online weekly. Each edition contains stories and articles related to the Wikipedia community.

The publication was founded in January 2005 by Wikipedia administrator and later Chair of the Wikimedia Foundation Board of Trustees, Michael Snow. Originally titled The Wikipedia Signpost, it was later shortened to The Signpost. The newspaper reports on Wikipedia events including Arbitration Committee rulings, Wikimedia Foundation issues, and other Wikipedia-related projects. Snow continued to contribute as a writer to The Signpost until his appointment to the Board of Trustees of the Wikimedia Foundation in February 2008.

Investigative journalism by The Signpost in 2015 on changes to freedom of panorama copyright restrictions in Europe was covered by publications in multiple languages including German, Italian, Polish, and Russian. Wikipedia users Gamaliel and Go Phightins! became editors-in-chief of The Signpost in January 2015; prior editor-in-chief The ed17 noted that during his tenure the publication expanded its scope by including more reporting on the wider Wikimedia movement and English Wikipedia itself. In a letter to readers upon the newspaper's tenth anniversary, the co-editors-in-chief stressed the importance of maintaining independence from the Wikimedia Foundation in their reporting.

The Signpost has been the subject of academic analysis in publications including Sociological Forum, the social movements journal Interface, and New Review of Academic Librarianship; and was consulted for data on Wikipedia by researchers from Los Alamos National Laboratory and Dartmouth College. It has garnered "positive" reception from some media publications including The New York Times, The Register, Nonprofit Quarterly, and Heise Online. John Broughton's 2008 book Wikipedia: The Missing Manual called The Signpost "essential reading for ambitious new Wikipedia editors".

Other community news publications include the "WikiWorld" web comic, the Wikipedia Weekly podcast, and newsletters of specific WikiProjects like The Bugle from WikiProject Military History and the monthly newsletter from The Guild of Copy Editors. There are a number of publications from the Wikimedia Foundation and multilingual publications such as the Wikimedia Blog and This Month in Education.

See also 
 English Wikipedia blackout
 Deletionpedia

Footnotes

References 

 (alkaline paper).

External links 

 
 English Wikipedia on Meta-Wiki

2001 establishments in the United States
Articles containing video clips
Wikipedia
Global culture
Internet properties established in 2001
Wikipedias by language
Wikipedias in Germanic languages